This is a list of German exonyms for places in Croatia.
The entire territory that belongs today to the Republic of Croatia, was governed by Austria-Hungary until 1918, and some Hungarian exonyms became common in German, and have been used interchangeably with the German exonym for a period. These Hungarian names are noted below.  Additionally, parts of these territories ruled by Austria-Hungary were formerly governed by the Republic of Venice, the Republic of Ragusa, and the Kingdom of Italy, and Italian names also migrated to German usage; these names are also noted.

Not included are translations of non-proper nouns, names spelled the same, and names respelled to match German pronunciation rules.

Cities and regions

Natural locations

References 

 

German exonym
Croatia
Croatia
 Croatia
 Exonym
 Exonym
German exonyms for places in Croatia
German